The Almö Bridge, inaugurated in 1960, was built to connect the island of Tjörn to the Swedish mainland. Built after a suggestion from Krupp, and on a budget, the arch bridge type was cheap but it also had narrow roadways forcing heavy traffic to slow down.
Below it was the busy shipping lane leading to the town of Uddevalla, which sported a large shipyard and bulk harbor at the time.

Collapse

The Almö bridge collapsed at 01:30 AM on 18 January 1980, when the bulk carrier  struck the bridge arch, collapsing the main span. The roadway landed on top of the ship, destroying the ship's bridge but causing no casualties on the ship. The loss of the ship's bridge made radio communication difficult, as the Swedish pilot had to use a handheld VHF radio. Because of the ice the ship was unable to launch a boat to get to shore and warn motorists as a fog was descending on the area. Eight people died that night as they drove over the edge until the road on the Tjörn side was closed 40 minutes after the accident. The mainland side had been closed by a lorry driver who had crept up the bridge in the fog and had grown suspicious when the railing disappeared. He was able to stop his lorry ten meters before the abyss.

The bridge today
The large arch foundations still exist but the bridge was never rebuilt.
Instead the Tjörn Bridge, a new cable-stayed bridge, was constructed in 17 months and inaugurated the following year. This bridge type eliminated the collision risk that had doomed its predecessor and also had wider lanes for road traffic.

References

Printed Sources
Brodin, Sune, Tjörnbron (Tjörn bridge), 1984 Vägverket Borlänge,

External links 

 Tjörnbrokatastrofen (radio documentary in Swedish)

1980 road incidents
Arch bridges
Bridges completed in 1960
Bridge disasters caused by collision
Bridge disasters in Sweden
Former buildings and structures in Sweden
Road incidents in Sweden
Demolished buildings and structures in Sweden
Maritime incidents in Sweden
Former bridges